A hemangiopericytoma is a type of soft-tissue sarcoma that originates in the pericytes in the walls of capillaries. When inside the nervous system, although not strictly a meningioma tumor, it is a meningeal tumor with a special aggressive behavior. It was first characterized in 1942.

Signs and symptoms 
Symptoms of hemangiopericytoma vary greatly depending on both tumor stage and affected organs. Most patients report pain and mass-related symptoms, while others also report vascular disease-related symptoms, and some have no symptoms until late in the disease process. Hemangiopericytomas are most commonly found in the meninges, lower extremities, retroperitoneum, pelvis, lungs, and pleura.

Histopathology
Hemangiopericytomas are tumors that are derived from specialized spindle shaped cells called pericytes, which line capillaries. 

Hemangiopericytoma located in the cerebral cavity is an aggressive tumor of the mesenchyme with oval nuclei with scant cytoplasm. "There is dense intercellular reticulin staining. Tumor cells can be fibroblastic, myxoid, or pericytic. These tumors, in contrast to meningiomas, do not stain with epithelial membrane antigen. They have a grade 2 or 3 biological behavior, and need to be distinguished from benign meningiomas because of their high rate of recurrence (68.2%) and metastases.

Diagnosis
Computerized tomography and magnetic resonance imaging are not effective methods for diagnosis of hemangiocytomas. In practice, a presumptive diagnosis is often reached through exclusion of other soft tissue tumors, and a tissue biopsy is required to confirm diagnosis.

Treatment
Depending on the grade of the sarcoma, it is treated with surgery, chemotherapy, and/or radiotherapy. Though surgery is the current standard of care for hemangiopericytomas, metastasis and tumor recurrence occur in more than 30% of patients, in particular recurrence in the pelvis and retroperitoneum and metastasis in bone and lungs. Radiotherapy does not appear to provide a significant survival benefit but is recommended for use in patients with tumors greater than 5 cm in diameter or with inadequate resection margins after surgery. Clinical benefits of chemotherapy in soft tissue tumors remains unclear. However, the combination of surgery and chemotherapy appears to worsen survival in hemangiopericytoma patients.

More research is needed to determine efficacy of different types of treatment.

Epidemiology
In one series, the median age of affected individuals was 45 years, with a 10-year survival rate of 70 percent. In another study, age over 45 and female sex were associated with worse survival rates in hemangiopericytomas.

See also 
 Infantile hemangiopericytoma
 List of cutaneous conditions

References

Further reading

External links 

Dermal and subcutaneous growths
Vascular neoplasia
Nervous system neoplasia
Brain tumor